Samir Khuller (born 1965) is a professor of Computer Science and the Peter and Adrienne Barris Chair of Computer Science at Northwestern University. He was previously Professor and Elizabeth Stevinson Iribe Chair of Computer Science in the University of Maryland's Department of Computer Science.

Biography
Khuller obtained his undergraduate degree from the Indian Institute of Technology Kanpur and was awarded a PhD in 1990 from  Cornell University as a student of Vijay Vazirani. From 1990 to 1992, he was a research associate at UMIACS (the Institute for Advanced Computer Studies), a division of the University of Maryland. In 1992 he joined the faculty of the University of Maryland Department of Computer Science. He became the Elizabeth Stevinson Iribe Chair of Computer Science at the Department of Computer Science in 2012, a position he held until 2017.

He was named a Distinguished Scholar Teacher and received a Google Research Award in 2007.

Khuller joined Northwestern University's McCormick School of Engineering in March 2019 as the first Peter and Adrienne Barris Chair of Computer Science at the Department of Computer Science.

He was named to the 2022 class of ACM Fellows, "for contributions to algorithm design with real-world implications and for mentoring and community-building".

References

External links
Samir Khuller
Google Scholar profile

Living people
1965 births
Indian computer scientists
University of Maryland, College Park faculty
Northwestern University faculty
Fellows of the Association for Computing Machinery